Meritorious Artist Năm Phỉ (1906–1954,) was a Vietnamese actress and singer.

Early life
Năm Phỉ's real name is Lê Thị Phỉ, given to her by her father "Công thành danh toại, phỉ chí nam nhi, bia truyền tạc để". Her father was a civil engineer; all of his 11 children attended the cải lương theatre. She was born in 1906 at Mỹ Tho town.

Career 
She began her career as a child singer at 10. Her father later renounced her. From 1926 to the beginning World War II, she worked with companies, such as Nam Đồng band, Tái Đồng band, Văn Hí band, Phước Cương band. She came to Europe to perform and record at Paris Expositions, in 1931 and 1937.

At her peak, Năm Phỉ's worth was about 230 thousand (≈ some thousand ounces). She received 186 love letters, 1009 postcards, 167 photographs and was discussed in 42 articles.

Career

 Tham phú phụ bần
 Ơn đến oán trả
 Thiện ác hữu báo
 Bội thê thiên xử
 Chí Thiện - Chí Hiếu
 Sắc đẹp giết người
 Vì đâu nên nỗi
 Lý Ngọc Nương in The lady with the camellias
 Pang Consort in The case of Pang Consort
 Diaochan in Lü Bu wheedles Diaochan (or Phụng Nghi House)
 Mộng Hoa in Lady Mộng Hoa
 Lan in Lan and Điệp

Honor
 Four medals of Paris Exposition.
 Kim Tiền Medal by Emperor Bảo Đại pre-1940.
 The designating as Lê Thị Phỉ Road at Mỹ Tho City.

Personal life
Năm Phỉ married actor Hai Giỏi before she was 18, however he died shortly after. After 1926, she remarried with manager Nguyễn Phước Cương, who was a descendant of Emperor Thành Thái. Her second marriage only lasted a few years before divorce. Mr Nguyễn Phước Cương remarried Năm Phỉ's younger sister Bảy Nam. Phước Cương and Bảy Nam's daughter Kim Cương called her as Momma.

References

External links 

 
 
 

1906 births
1954 deaths
People from Tiền Giang province
Vietnamese actresses
20th-century Vietnamese women singers